Richard Barton Lewis is an American film producer and writer. He is the founder and CEO of Southpaw Entertainment and co-founder of Trilogy Entertainment.

Education
Lewis is a graduate of UC Berkeley's department of Biological Anthropology, and received his master's degree from UCLA's School of Motion Picture and Television Production.

Career
Lewis has produced 16 films, 11 soundtracks, and over 300 hours of prime time television. Lewis's productions have received more than 135 Oscar, Emmy, Golden Globe and other entertainment awards. He has developed and produced Oscar nominated films such as August Rush, Robin Hood: Prince of Thieves, and Backdraft as well as the Emmy Awarding winning MGM/UA series The Outer Limits.

Lewis led production on Warner Bros' film August Rush, producing both the film and its Oscar and Grammy nominated soundtrack, as well as the Broadway musical adapted by director John Doyle. His most recent release was the sci-fi love story, The Space Between Us.  Asa Butterfield starred in this interplanetary adventure based on a story co-written by Lewis about the first human born on Mars who dreams of coming to Earth.

In 2020, Lewis co-produced the thriller feature film Inheritance for his company Southpaw Entertainment.

Filmography

Awards and nominations

References

Sources

External links

American film producers
Living people
Primetime Emmy Award winners
Place of birth missing (living people)
American chief executives
University of California, Berkeley alumni
UCLA Film School alumni
American film production company founders
1953 births